The 1964 Campeon de Campeones was the 23rd Mexican Super Cup football  one-leg match played on April 26, 1964.

 League winners: Guadalajara
 Cup winners: Club América

Match details

References

Campeón de Campeones
Campeon De Campeones, 1964
Campeon De Campeones, 1964
Campeon De Campeones, 1964
April 1964 sports events in Mexico